Central Bank of India (CBI) is an central public sector bank under the ownership of Ministry of Finance, Government of India. It is based in Mumbai. Despite its name, it is not the central bank of India; The Indian central bank is the Reserve Bank of India.

History

The Central Bank of India was established on 21 December 1911 by Sir Sorabji Pochkhanawala with Sir Pherozeshah Mehta as Chairman, and the first commercial Indian bank completely owned and managed by Indians.

Early-20th century
By 1918 Central Bank of India had established a branch in Hyderabad. A branch in nearby Secunderabad followed in 1925.

In 1923, it acquired the Tata Industrial Bank in the wake of the failure of the Alliance Bank of Simla. The Tata bank, established in 1917, had opened a branch in Madras in 1920 that became the Central Bank of India, Madras.

Central Bank of India was instrumental in the creation of the first Indian exchange bank, the Central Exchange Bank of India, which opened in London in 1936. However, Barclays Bank acquired Central Exchange Bank of India in 1938.

Also before World War II, Central Bank of India established a branch in Rangoon. The branch's operations concentrated on business between Burma and India, and especially money transmission via telegraphic transfer. Profits derived primarily from foreign exchange and margins. The bank also lent against land, produce, and other assets, mostly to Indian businesses.

Post-World War II
In 1963, the revolutionary government in Burma nationalized Central Bank of India's operations there, which became People's Bank No. 1.

In 1969, the Indian Government nationalized the bank on 19 July, together with 13 others.

 

Central Bank of India was one of the first banks in India to issue credit cards in the year 1980 in collaboration with Mastercard.

On its 108th Foundation day, Central Bank of India launched its first step towards robotic banking, a robot named "MEDHA".

CBI is one of twelve public sector banks in India that was recapitalised in 2009.

As on 31 March 2021, the bank has a network of 4,608 branches, 3,644 ATMs, ten satellite offices and one extension counter. It has a pan-India presence covering all 28 states, Seven out of eight union territories and 574 district headquarters  out of all districts in the country.

Controversies 
In the 1980s the managers of the London branches of Central Bank of India, Punjab National Bank, and Union Bank of India were caught up in a fraud in which they made dubious loans to the Bangladeshi jute trader Rajender Singh Sethia. The regulatory authorities in England and India forced all three Indian banks to close their London branches.

References

Cited sources
Turnell, Sean (2009) Fiery Dragons: Banks, Moneylenders and Microfinnance in Burma. (NAIS Press). 

Public Sector Banks in India
Banks established in 1911
Banks based in Mumbai
Companies nationalised by the Government of India
Indian companies established in 1911
Companies listed on the National Stock Exchange of India
Companies listed on the Bombay Stock Exchange